American singer-songwriter Fiona Apple has recorded songs for her five studio albums and collaborated with other artists for duets and featured songs on their respective albums. After signing a contract in 1995 with the Work Group, a division of Sony Music, eighteen-year-old Apple moved from New York to Los Angeles to record her debut album, Tidal (1996). She wrote all of its songs, and would continue to do so for her later albums. "Shadowboxer" was Tidals lead single, later followed by "Slow Like Honey", "Sleep to Dream", "The First Taste", "Criminal" and "Never Is a Promise". In 1998, Apple also recorded two cover versions for the film soundtrack Pleasantville: "Across the Universe" (Lennon–McCartney) and "Please Send Me Someone to Love" (Percy Mayfield). Sony released Apple's second album, When the Pawn..., in 1999, which was less commercially successful than her debut. It included the singles "Fast as You Can", "Limp" and "Paper Bag".

After a six-year hiatus, Extraordinary Machine (2005) was released by Sony. Its singles included "Parting Gift", "O' Sailor", "Not About Love", and "Get Him Back". A year later, Apple recorded "Sally's Song", a song written by composer Danny Elfman, for the special edition soundtrack to The Nightmare Before Christmas. In 2012, Sony released "Every Single Night", the lead single of Apple's fourth album, The Idler Wheel..., which was released soon after. This single was followed by "Werewolf" and "Anything We Want". That year also saw Apple record "Dull Tool", her first original song for a film soundtrack, for the film This Is 40. After an eight-year hiatus, Fetch the Bolt Cutters (2020) was released by Sony. Its lead single, "Shameika", was released soon after. The album was met with widespread acclaim, with many critics deeming it an instant classic, a masterpiece, and Apple's best work to date.

In addition, Apple has recorded five songs for compilation albums, including "Frosty the Snowman" for the holiday album Christmas Calling (2003), "I Walk a Little Faster" and "Why Try to Change Me Now" for The Best Is Yet to Come: The Songs of Cy Coleman (2009), "So Sleepy" (featuring Jon Brion and the Punch Brothers) for Chickens in Love (2010), "Everyday" (with Brion) for Rave On Buddy Holly (2011), and "I'm in the Middle of a Riddle" (featuring Maude Maggart) for Sweetheart 2014 (2014). Collaborations appearing on other artists' albums include "Bridge over Troubled Water" and "Father and Son" for Johnny Cash's albums American IV: The Man Comes Around (2002) and Unearthed (2003), "Loveless" for Davíd Garza's Dream Delay (2008), and "You're the One I Love" for Sara Watkins Sun Midnight Sun (2012). Other collaborations released as singles include "Come On and Get It (Up in 'Dem Guts)" with Zach Galifianakis (2006) and "I Want You" with Elvis Costello (2006). Apple also performed the jazz standard "Angel Eyes" for the film Largo, though no official soundtrack was released.

List of songs

References

General
 

Specific

 
Apple, Fiona